Douglas John Parkinson (born 5 June 1945 in Hobart) is a former Australian politician. He was a Labor Party member of the Tasmanian Legislative Council for the electoral division of Hobart from 1994 until his retirement in 2012.

Parkinson studied at St Virgil's College and the University of Tasmania, obtaining a Bachelor of Economics with Honours in 1971. He worked for the Commonwealth Public Service before studying law. After obtaining an LL.B. in 1981, he established a legal practice in Hobart and lectured part-time at the University of Tasmania.

Parkinson was first elected to Hobart in 1994. The division was abolished in 1999. He was elected to the division of Wellington in 2000 and again in 2006, with the division reverting to its prior name of Hobart in 2008.

Parkinson has announced his intention to run as an independent candidate for election for the newly created Legislative Council division of Prosser, to be held  on 5 May 2018.

References

External links
Doug Parkinson's inaugural speech to parliament
Parliament of Tasmania biography

|-

|-

1945 births
Living people
Members of the Tasmanian Legislative Council
University of Tasmania alumni
Politicians from Hobart
University of New South Wales alumni
Academic staff of the University of Tasmania
Australian barristers
People educated at St Virgil's College
Australian Labor Party members of the Parliament of Tasmania
21st-century Australian politicians